The Ypané River (Spanish, Río Ypané) is a river of Paraguay. It is a tributary of the Paraguay River.

See also
List of rivers of Paraguay
 Tributaries of the Río de la Plata

References

Rand McNally, The New International Atlas, 1993.

Rivers of Paraguay
Tributaries of the Paraguay River